Bing sutt is a type of traditional cold drinking house started in Guangzhou (Canton) that spread to Hong Kong. These bing sutts arose in the 1950s and 1960s. They are characterized by old furniture and settings such as the small tiled floors, hanging fans, folding chairs and so on. A bing sutt provides light meals and drinks and is neighbourhood-oriented. It is believed to be the predecessor of the cha chaan teng.

Change
There were several bing sutts in Canton from 1970 to 1990s. However, most of them have closed now.

Since World War II, the dietary culture of Hong Kong became westernized. That was also the time when bing sutts started to become popular and created localized western menus to keep Hong Kong-style restaurants alive. Bing sutts hit the height of their popularity in the 1950s to 1960s.

Traditional bing sutts only provide drinks and localized western snacks. Although serving western menus, they keep the price low and thus become popular among people from various social statuses. Yet along with the development of cha chaan tengs, chained fast food shops and coffee shops, which sell a larger variety of food, bing sutts became less competitive. In the 1980s, many had no choice but to refine the traditional menus by adding rice and noodles so as to increase their competitiveness. 

In 1980s, the cold drink market in Guangzhou ushered in a large number of new frozen foods. These new inventions helped bing sutt regain its popularity. In 1990s, most bing sutt mainly served to tong sui, milk, coconut milk, tortoise jelly, and other sorts of desserts. Others served dishes such as cake, fried dumplings, soup, glutinous rice, fast food lunch boxes, snacks, bread, congee, etc. In the summer, a small number of bing sutt would also serve ice cream, and cold drinks. In Guangzhou, bing sutt became a large part of people's lives. Gradually there emerged the “Four Great Bing Sutt”; it included the Shun Kee Bing, Mei Lei Kyun Bing Sutt, Sunshine Bing Sutt, and Emperor Bing Sutt (there also the Rainbow Bing Sutt and the Heung Kwan Bing Sutt). As of today only the Shun Kee Bing Sutt still exists. The Mei Lei Kyun Bing Sutt has been brought under the Tai Ping Koon Restaurant.

With only a few dozen traditional bing sutts are still operating, with some others opened by the younger generation fascinated by the nostalgic atmosphere of the Hong Kong style restaurant. Realizing consumers’ desire to take a glimpse of memories, quite a number of fast food chains set up and adorn their unique experimental concept stores like bing sutts to attract customers. These newly established bing sutts are usually decorated with characterized furniture and settings such as the small tile floors, hanging fans, folding chairs and so on, all that remind people of the old days.  Some of them have become iconic tourist attractions as well.

Hong Kong's Bing sutt appeared in the 1960s by imitating a high-end western restaurant offering cheap Western-style light meals to cater to the needs of the working class. There are called coffee shops, tea ice rooms, ice halls, cafes, ice shop cake shops, tea ice halls. After the 1960s, the civilian population began to be sold. The Hong Kong Ice Room was originally a snack and was not a staple food. The Hong Kong restaurant licenses were divided into two types: "Ordinary Restaurant" and "Small Food Restaurant": "Ordinary Restaurant" can sell any food. "Small food restaurants" can only sell foods of the specified combination [8] Most of the ice rooms that do not sell staple foods have been degraded from the 1980s to the 1990s. The remaining ice rooms refer to the operation of tea restaurants and sell more types of food. As of 2007, there were only about 100 operations in the name of the ice room, most of which opened in the 1960s to the early 1970s.

Foods and drinks

Drinks

Red bean ice (a drink mixed with red beans, light rock sugar syrup and evaporated milk) 
Yuanyang (a mixture of coffee and tea)
Coffee (either instant or powder form)
Fruit punch
Hong Kong-style milk tea (black tea mixed with evaporated milk or condensed milk)

Pastry
Hong Kong style swiss roll (standard cake layer with whipped cream)
Paper wrapped cake (chiffon cake baked in a paper cup)
Fruit tart
Croissant 
Pineapple bun with butter 
Egg tart

Toast and sandwiches
Toast with butter
Sandwiches
French toast (called “Western Toast” in Chinese, transliteration of French toast)
Shrimp French toast

Other dishes
Macaroni in broth with fried egg and sausage
Swiss sauce chicken wings
Instant noodles
Rice served in dishes (served with sauce)

Difficulties 
Bing sutts have been facing difficulties in remaining in this modern city. The reason why the bing sutt is diminishing is changes in society, be it the change in tastes of consumers or the rise of the cha chaan teng. Most of the bing sutts encounter keen competition among cha chaan tengs with heavy rent. The popularity of cha chaan tengs has taken many customers away from bing sutts, leading to many traditional ones being eliminated from the market and leaving behind no more than twenty bing sutts in Hong Kong.

See also
Cantonese restaurant
Dai pai dong
Cha chaan teng buffet
Hong Kong cuisine
China Cafe, a former bing sutt in Mong Kok

References

External links
  Brief introduction to Starbucks Bing Sutt corner from Starbucks 
  Detail menu of Lim Kee Bing Sutt from OpenRice

Hong Kong cuisine
Cantonese cuisine
Restaurants in Hong Kong